"Can't Pretend" is the second single released by British singer-songwriter Tom Odell, from his debut studio album, Long Way Down (2013). The song was released in the United Kingdom as a digital download on 6 March 2013 and peaked at number 67 on the UK Singles Chart. It was used in the trailer "Desert" of the second season of The Newsroom, as well as The Blacklist episode "Milton Bobbit", Crisis épisode "Found" and The 100 episode "Earth Skills". Used on America's Got Talent

Live performances
On 23 February 2013 he performed the song live on British chat show The Jonathan Ross Show.

Track listing

Charts

Certifications

Release history

References

2013 debut singles
Tom Odell songs
2013 songs
Columbia Records singles
Songs written by Tom Odell